Olive Beamish (17 June, 1890 – 14 April, 1978) was an Irish-born suffragette, who wore a Women's Social and Political Union (WSPU) badge whilst still at school, and became involved in the militant suffragette movement, including attacking postboxes and arson. Beamish was also known as "Phyllis Brady". Beamish was imprisoned and force-fed and was one of the first to be released under the "Cat and Mouse" Act and later sentenced to 18 months with hard labour.

Early life 
Agnes Olive Beamish was born in Cork in Ireland. Her father was a Protestant farmer. She had brothers. Her parents supported their daughter joining Women's Social and Political Union (WSPU) in 1906 and she wore their badge to school, whilst living in Westbury-on-Trym, near Bristol, England, where they were had moved to by 1901. Beamish felt the inferior status of women when her brothers were able to engage in politics for the 1905 election, saying "I felt the position keenly, that I would never be equal to them in the political world, and I also realised the inferior position of women, everywhere." Beamish studied at Girton College Cambridge, mathematics and economics in 1912.

Suffrage activism 

Beamish began to organise for the WSPU at Battersea London as well as in the East End where she attacked a pillarbox.  On 19 March 1913, Trevethan, a mansion house in Egham, Surrey ( whose owner Lady White was out of the country) was ruined in an arson attack and fire, and messages were found in the garden referring to suffragette slogans, including "Stop torturing our comrades in prison" and  "Votes for Women".

Beamish was said by a local policeman as one of the two women cycling very fast, without lights, at one a.m. that night and she was identified under the pseudonym 'Phyllis Brady'.  And less than a month later, she was setting fire to Sanderstead station but not caught, and again "Phyllis Brady"/ Beamish was with Elsie Duval and both were arrested in Mitcham, with paraffin and other inflamables in suitcases. Beamish was sentenced to six weeks in Holloway prison.

Beamish went on hunger strike and was force fed. She and Elsie Duval were the first to be released on 28 April 1913 under what became known as the 'Cat and Mouse' Act  i.e. the Prisoners (Temporary Discharge for Ill Health) Act 1913. This allowed prisoners who may be at risk of dying from hunger strike/force feeding to be released on licence to recover and be re-arrested to complete their sentence later. Beamish went to Regents Park area, London and continued militant activities. The WSPU HQ was asked about the whereabouts of the three released under the Act by the Daily Mirror and a spokeswoman talked about the cat being away and the mice able to play, and explained their intentions to make this Act as 'ridiculous as anything the Government has done to frustrate our movement" and threatened that suffragettes had plans 'of which they little dream."

Dr Flora Murray wrote to the Glasgow Herald that she had carried out urine tests on Kitty Marion and Beamish during their hunger strike, and found high levels of a hypnotic drug bromide which was used as a muscle relaxant (to prevent vomiting during force feeding) which the doctor said "could only be harmful", and that as Beamish was preparing her defence for the trial, she may have tried to obtain an emetic to make herself vomit the hypnotic drugs.

A survelliance image of Olive Beamish (Phyllis Brady) in Holloway prison is in the Museum of London archive.

Later life 
During the First World War, Beamish was a social organiser based in Hoxton. She then ran her own typing agency business for 21 years in the City of London to 1930, and was on the executive of the Association of Women Clerks and Secretaries. She was in the Communist Party from 1926-9, but joined the Labour Party then and became Secretary of the Chelmsford Labour Party. Beamish supported the Republican faction in the Spanish Civil War.

Beamish died in Suffolk in 1978.

References 

1890 births
1978 deaths
Irish suffragettes
Force-feeding
Women's Social and Political Union
Alumni of Girton College, Cambridge